Maria Angelina Lopes Sarmento, known as Lita Sarmento, (born 10 July 1978) is an East Timorese politician from the People's Liberation Party. She is currently Vice-President of the National Parliament.

References 

1978 births
Living people
Women legislative deputy speakers

East Timorese women in politics
21st-century women politicians
People's Liberation Party (East Timor) politicians
Members of the National Parliament (East Timor)
Presidents of the National Parliament (East Timor)